Not Negotiable is a 1918 British silent crime film directed by Walter West and starring Julian Royce, Manora Thew and Gregory Scott.

Cast
 Julian Royce as John Carslake
 Manora Thew as Dorothy Saville
 Gregory Scott as Claude Saville
 Hubert Woodward as James Coglan
 Arthur Walcott
 Helen Haye

References

External links

1918 films
Films directed by Walter West
1918 crime films
British crime films
British silent feature films
Broadwest films
British black-and-white films
1910s English-language films
1910s British films